Grant Thornton may refer to:

 Grant Thornton International, a professional services network
 Grant Thornton LLP, a U.S. accounting firm
 Raymond Chabot Grant Thornton, a Canadian accounting firm
 Grant Thornton Tower, an office tower in Chicago, Illinois, USA
 Grant Thornton (cricketer), a British cricket player

See also

 
 Raymond Chabot Grant Thornton Park, a baseball stadium in Ottawa, Ontario, Canada
 Thornton (surname)
 Thornton (disambiguation)
 Grant (disambiguation)